Ricardo Queiroz de Alencastro Graça (born 16 February 1997), known as Ricardo Graça, is a Brazilian footballer who plays for Júbilo Iwata as a centre back.

Career statistics

Honours

International
Brazil Olympic
Summer Olympics: 2020

References

External links

1997 births
Living people
Brazilian footballers
Association football defenders
Campeonato Brasileiro Série A players
Campeonato Brasileiro Série B players
CR Vasco da Gama players
Brazilian expatriate footballers
Brazilian expatriate sportspeople in Portugal
Expatriate footballers in Portugal
Olympic footballers of Brazil
Footballers at the 2020 Summer Olympics
Olympic medalists in football
Olympic gold medalists for Brazil
Medalists at the 2020 Summer Olympics
Footballers from Rio de Janeiro (city)